Isaac "Zak" Fe'aunati (born 23 July 1973) is a former rugby union player for Bath Rugby in Premiership Rugby. Fe'aunati's played as a number eight.

Career
Fe'aunati was born in Wellington, New Zealand. In September 1995 he joined Melrose, debuting for the club in their 31–3 home victory over Hawick on 13 September 1995.

He retired from professional rugby in 2008 to take up a coaching position at Bishop Vesey's Grammar School on 2 June 2008. He also played Jonah Lomu in the 2009 film Invictus.
In July 2014, Fe'aunati stepped down from his position as Director of Rugby at Bishop Vesey's Grammar School to return with his family to New Zealand.

References

External links
Bath Rugby profile

1973 births
Melrose RFC players
Bath Rugby players
Living people
New Zealand male film actors
New Zealand rugby union coaches
New Zealand rugby union players
Rotherham Titans players
Samoa international rugby union players
Actors of Samoan descent
New Zealand sportspeople of Samoan descent
Expatriate rugby union players in Scotland
New Zealand expatriate sportspeople in Scotland